Chris Earl Mathewson (born October 29, 1983), known professionally as Earl is an American recording artist who is best known for his single “Fire the Fuse” and is listed as a MTV Artist To Watch.

Early life
Earl was born in Jacksonville, North Carolina, the son of Glenn Mathewson, an engineer and marine, and Shelby Mathewson. When he was eight years old his family moved to Stafford, Virginia, where he attended North Stafford High School.

Career
In 2014, after being a tattoo artist for eleven years, Earl began his career as a recording artist. He chose the name Earl after his middle name and says it is also an acronym for “Existence After Real Love”. Earl creates music to give a Christ-like perspective and his lyrics never contain profanity.,

Fire the Fuse
In 2016 Earl released his single “Fire the Fuse”.  The song received international radio play and was marketed to various night clubs and received a positive response from music critics.

Discography

Singles

2015: "Crushed Diamonds"
2016: "Release the Hold"
2016: "Restless"
2016: "Fire the Fuse"

References

External links 

 

1983 births
Living people